"Father to a Sister of Thought" is a song written by Stephen Malkmus of Pavement that appears on the band's third album, Wowee Zowee. On June 27, 1995, the song was released as the second single from the album in 7" vinyl and CD-single formats; the track list is the same for both versions. Both B-sides are included amongst the bonus tracks on 2006's deluxe Sordid Sentinels Edition reissue of Wowee Zowee.

Music video 
The music video for "Father to a Sister of Thought" features the band playing together in front of a western-themed props painted by Steve Keene, which were also used by the band on tour during the period.

Track listing

References

External links

1995 singles
Pavement (band) songs
1994 songs
Songs written by Stephen Malkmus
Matador Records singles
Alternative country songs